Piotr Hain (born 26 February 1991) is a Polish volleyball player. At the professional club level, he plays for GKS Katowice.

Career
Hain competed for Poland at the 2009 U19 World Championship held in Italy. In 2010, he represented his native country at the U20 European Championship.

Honours

Universiade
 2013  Summer Universiade

References

External links
 
 Player profile at PlusLiga.pl 
 Player profile at Volleybox.net

1991 births
Living people
People from Tarnowskie Góry
Sportspeople from Silesian Voivodeship
Polish men's volleyball players
Universiade medalists in volleyball
Medalists at the 2013 Summer Universiade
Universiade silver medalists for Poland
AZS Olsztyn players
Jastrzębski Węgiel players
Cuprum Lubin players
Resovia (volleyball) players
GKS Katowice (volleyball) players
Middle blockers